The O.L. Luther Unit is a state prison for men located in Navasota, Grimes County, Texas, owned and operated by the Texas Department of Criminal Justice.  This facility was opened in July 1982, and has a maximum capacity of 1316: 1102 in the unit itself, and another 214 in the trusty camp.

Luther is co-located with the state's Wallace Pack Unit, with its own population of about 1500 prisoners.  Prisoners of both facilities cooperate in an extensive agricultural operation on 11,000 acres, including horses, a cow/calf operation, grain processing and storage, and a buffalo ranch.

Incidents 

The facility has had a difficult history.  In October 2001 inmate Nathan Essary was sexually abused by a corrections officer, sued, and discovered other inmate victims of the same officer.  Their official complaints had been ignored.  Essary collected "substantial" money damages in a civil case, as well as a payment from the state and the officer's beach house.  In 2011, within a six-month period, two Luther guards were caught, fired, arrested, and charged with felonies related to bribery and smuggling.

References

Prisons in Texas
Buildings and structures in Grimes County, Texas
1982 establishments in Texas